Cockermouth is a civil parish and a town in the Borough of Allerdale in Cumbria, England.  It contains 105 listed buildings that are recorded in the National Heritage List for England.  Of these, six are listed at Grade I, the highest of the three grades, seven are at Grade II*, the middle grade, and the others are at Grade II, the lowest grade.  Cockermouth is a market town at the confluence of the Rivers Derwent and Cocker, and bridges crossing these rivers are listed.  The oldest surviving building is Cockermouth Castle, parts of which are in ruins, and parts are inhabited; these are all listed.  Historically the town's industries have been milling and brewing.  Former mills that have been adapted for other uses, and part of a brewery are listed.  Most of the other listed buildings are houses, cottages and associated structures.  A variety of other buildings are listed, including schools, churches, hotels, public houses, a former hospice, a milestone, a former court house, a former bank, a statue, and the town hall.


Key

Buildings

References

Citations

Sources

Lists of listed buildings in Cumbria
Listed